The fifth season of the American comedy-drama television series Orange Is the New Black premiered on Netflix on June 9, 2017, at 12:00 am PST in multiple countries. It consists of thirteen episodes, each between 51 and 60 minutes. The series is based on Piper Kerman's memoir, Orange Is the New Black: My Year in a Women's Prison (2010), about her experiences at FCI Danbury, a minimum-security federal prison. The series is created and adapted for television by Jenji Kohan.

Episodes

Cast and characters

Main cast

Special guest stars
 Jason Biggs as Larry Bloom
 Samira Wiley as Poussey Washington

Recurring cast

Inmates

Production
In February 2016, the series was renewed for a fifth, sixth, and seventh season. The fifth season was released on June 9, 2017.

Cyberhack
In April 2017, it was reported that a cybercriminal had stolen the first ten episodes of the fifth season in a security breach of a post-production company. Netflix failed to respond to ransom demands, and the cybercriminal leaked the episodes online. Netflix confirmed the security breach and an ongoing investigation by federal law enforcement. Multichannel News reported that demand for the series significantly increased over the seven-day period following the leak of the episodes. It was also said that the leak would likely cause a decrease in demand for the fifth season when Netflix releases it in June.

Reception

Critical reception
The fifth season has received "generally favorable reviews". On Metacritic, it has a score of 67 out of 100 based on 20 reviews. On Rotten Tomatoes, it has a 76% rating with an average score of 7.47 out of 10 based on 33 reviews.

References

External links
 
 

Orange Is the New Black
2017 American television seasons